5-Cyclohexadecenone is a macrocyclic synthetic musk with the chemical formula C16H28O.  It is an unsaturated analog of cyclohexadecanone.  It is also similar in chemical structure to the natural musk scents civetone and muscone.

5-Cyclohexadecenone has a strong musk scent with floral, amber, and civet tones. It is used as a substitute for natural musk in perfumes, cosmetics, and soaps. Trade names include Ambretone, Velvione,  and TM-II.

5-Cyclohexadecenone can exist as either of two cis/trans isomers and the commercial product is typically a mixture of the two.   It can be synthesized in a four-step sequence from cyclododecanone.

References

Macrocycles
Ketones
Perfume ingredients